2014 Winter Olympics Parade of Nations was part of the opening ceremony at the 2014 Winter Olympics. The national team from each nation participating in the Olympic Games was preceded by their national flag flag bearer into Fisht Olympic Stadium in the host city of Sochi, Russia. The flag bearer was an athlete of each national delegation chosen, to represent the athletes, either by the National Olympic Committee or by the national team.

The order of the parade was by Olympic tradition with Greece, originator of the modern games, entering first. The host nation, Russia, entered last. The nations entered in Russian alphabetic order. As each national team entered their name was announced by IOC guidelines in the official languages and customs: French, then English and Russian.

List
Below is a list of parading countries and their announced flag bearer, in the same order as the parade.  This is sortable by country name, flag bearer's name, or flag bearer's sport.  Names are given in the form officially designated by the IOC.

See also
 2014 Winter Paralympics national flag bearers

References

External links

Parade of Nations
Lists of Olympic flag bearers
Parades in Russia